A bilby is an Australian mammal in the genus Macrotis; the two species are known as:
 Lesser bilby, extinct since the 1950s
 Greater bilby, now commonly referred to as the bilby

Bilby may also refer to:

People
 Bilby, a variant of the surname Bilbe
 Bruce Bilby (1922-2013), British mechanical engineer
 Grahame Bilby (born 1941), New Zealand cricketer and soccer player
 John S. Bilby (1832–1919), founder of the Bilby Ranch, USA
 Kenneth W. Bilby (1918-1997), American awardee of the Legion of Honor, executive vice president and author
 Oscar Bilby, American farmer claimed as the inventor of the hamburger in 1891
 Richard Bilby (1931-1998), United States district judge for Arizona

Places
 Bilby, Alberta, Canada
 Bilby, Nottinghamshire, England

Other
 BILBY Award, an Australian award for children's books
 Bilby tower, a type of steel survey tower
 Bilby (film), an animated short film
 Easter Bilby, an Australian alternative to the Easter Bunny

See also 
Bilby's Doll, an opera by the American composer Carlisle Lloyd
 Bielby, a village in the East Riding of Yorkshire, England